Bad Image is the fourth studio album by Kingdom Come.

Track listing
All songs by Lenny Wolf, except lyrics on "Friends" by Wolf and Carol Tatum
 "Passion Departed" – 4:50
 "You're the One" – 5:20
 "Fake Believer" – 3:49
 "Friends" – 4:38
 "Mad Queen" – 4:13
 "Pardon the Difference (But I Like It)" – 1:51
 "Little Wild Thing" – 3:19
 "Can't Resist" – 5:02
 "Talked Too Much" – 3:22
 "Glove of Stone" – 5:01
 "Outsider" – 4:35

Personnel
Kingdom Come
 Lenny Wolf – lead vocals, rhythm guitar, guitar solos, bass, producer

Additional musicians
 Billy Liesgang,  Heiko Radke-Sieb – guitar solos
 Kai Fricke – drums

Production
Paul McKenna – engineer at Kiva-West Studio
Brian Soucy – assistant engineer
Jeo Wildhack, Michael Tibes – engineers at Château du Pope

References

External links
 Bad Image lyrics

Kingdom Come (band) albums
1993 albums
Warner Music Group albums